Events from the 1370s in Denmark.

Incumbents 
 Monarch – Valdemar IV of Denmark (until 1375), Olaf II of Denmark

Events 

1370
 24 May  The Treaty of Stralsund is signed, ending the war between the Hanseatic League and the kingdom of Denmark which had been ongoing since 1361. The treaty stipulated the destruction of Absalon's Castle.

1375
 St. Peter's Church in Næstved is expanded.

Births

Deaths 
 15 June 1370  Ingeborg of Denmark, princess of Denmark (born 1347)
 1374  Helvig of Schleswig, noblewoman (born 1320)
 24 October 1375  Valdemar IV of Denmark, King of Denmark (born 1329)

References 

1370s in Denmark